Nasalsa was a Nubian queen of the Kingdom of Kush dated to the Twenty-fifth Dynasty of Egypt. She is known from a shabti, some inscriptions on tablets and cups, text on the stela of Khaliut, a dedication inscription and a text from Kawa. Dodson mentions that Nasalsa is named on the Enthronement Stela of Atlanersa and on the Election and Adoption Stelae of Aspelta. These stelae were from Gebel Barkal.

Life
Nasalsa was a daughter of Atlanersa, the sister-wife of Senkamanisken, and the mother of Kings Anlamani and Aspelta as well as of Queen Madiqen.

Anlamani's stela (Kawa VIII) has a passage describing Nasalsa being called and finding her son on the throne:
 Now the king's mother Nasalsa, may she live forever, was amongst the royal sisters. The royal mother, sweet of love, was the mistress of all the wives. His Majesty sent companions in order that she may be brought. She found her son appearing like Horus on his throne. She was very greatly joyful after she saw the beauty of His Majesty.

Aspelta's Adoption stela refers to Nasalsa as the King's Sister, the King's Mother, Mistress of Cush, and Daughter of Re. The inscription states that Nasalsa was the daughter of King's Sister, the Adoratrix of Amen-Re at Thebes Amenirdis. The relationship is likely one through adoption, because the Adoratrix in Thebes was thought to be celibate. The mention of "Daughter of Re" was the first time a Queen of Kush had used that title.

References

8th-century BC women
Queens consort of the Twenty-fifth Dynasty of Egypt
8th-century BC Egyptian people